Terminal verification results (TVR) or Tag '95' is an EMV data object .  The TVR is a series of bits set by the terminal reading an EMV card, based on logical tests (for example has the card expired).  This data object is used in the terminal's decision whether to accept, decline or go on-line for a payment transaction.  The format of the TVR is as follows:

See also
 EMV

References
 EMV Specification Bulletins
 EMV Specification

External links
 Online decoder

EMV